Upper Lake is a lake in Killarney National Park, County Kerry, Ireland. It is one of the Lakes of Killarney, along with Muckross Lake and Lough Leane.

See also 
 List of loughs in Ireland

References 

Lakes of County Kerry
Killarney